Sclerolobium beaureipairei is a species of legume in the family Fabaceae.
It is endemic to Brazil.

References
 

Caesalpinioideae
Flora of Brazil
Endangered plants
Taxonomy articles created by Polbot
Taxobox binomials not recognized by IUCN